Below is the list of players that have scored a hat-trick in a Kategoria Superiore match since the beginning of the league in 1930. The first edition was held in 1911, but it is not officially recognized by AFA.

The fixture between Besëlidhja Lezhë and Tomori Berat at Lezhë in 2001 saw both Xhelal Farruku and Gëzim Tabaku score a hat-trick for the home team, while Kliton Cafi scored three goals of Tomori. This is also the only match in which three players have scored a hat-trick. Refik Resmja is the only player in history to score a hat-trick in four consecutive matches, while Indrit Fortuzi and Pero Pejić are the only players to score a hat-trick in two consecutive matches. Resmja is also the only player to score six and seven goals in one match, while he, Roland Dervishi, Dorian Bylykbashi and Indrit Fortuzi are the only players to have scored five goals in one match.

Refik Resmja has scored three or more goals in ten times in the Kategoria Superiore, more than any other player. He has set this record in only one season, during 1951 Albanian Superliga season where he scored 59 goals in only 23 matches, being followed by Vioresin Sinani with nine hat-tricks and Croatian forward Pero Pejić with seven hat-tricks; Hamdi Salihi has scored six hat-trick while Indrit Fortuzi and Daniel Xhafa have scored five hat-tricks each. Only two players have each scored hat-tricks for three clubs: Pero Pejić (Dinamo Tirana, Skënderbeu Korçë and Kukësi) and Daniel Xhafa (Bylis Ballsh, Teuta Durrës and Besa Kavajë).

Hat-tricks

Note: The results column shows the home team score first

.

Multiple hat-tricks
The following table lists the minimum number of hat-tricks scored by players who have scored two or more hat-tricks.

Bold  are still active in the Albanian Superliga.

See also
Albanian Superliga
Albanian Superliga Player of the Month
List of Albanian Superliga all-time goalscorers

References 
112. http://www.panorama.com.al/sport/video-rikthehet-tirana-e-frikshme-xhixha-protagonist-absolut-ne-fitoren-e-thelle-ndaj-teutes/

Hat-tricks
Albanian Superliga